Gianfranco Michele Maisano, best known as Michele (born 22 June 1944) is an Italian singer and actor.

Background 
Born in Vigevano, as a child Maisano moved to Genoa, where he attended the Nautical Institute. He recorded his first single at age 14. Abandoned the name Michele Maisano, he obtained his first success as Michele in 1963 with the song "Se mi vuoi lasciare", which won the musical contest Cantagiro and ranked first in the Italian hit parade.

In the sixties Michele then achieved some further successes including some cover versions to songs by Elvis Presley. After a less successful period, in 1971, he got one another main success with the song "Susan dei Marinai", with an uncredited contribution to the lyrics by Fabrizio De André. In 1970 Michele entered the competition at the Sanremo Music Festival with the song "L'addio", followed two years later by another participation with the song "Forestiero". During his career Michele was also a music producer and an occasional actor.

Discography

Selected singles

Studio albums
1963 Michele
1966 Se sei sola
1970 Ritratto di un cantante
1971 Vivendo cantando
1973 Cantautori

References

External links

1944 births
People from Vigevano
Italian pop singers
Living people